Ítala Nandi (born 4 June 1942) is a Brazilian actress. She has appeared in 33 films and television shows since 1964. She starred in the 1974 film Sagarana: The Duel, which was entered into the 24th Berlin International Film Festival.

Selected filmography
 Pindorama (1970)
 Of Gods and the Undead (1970)
 Awakening of the Beast (1970)
 Sagarana: The Duel (1974)
 Luz del Fuego (1982)
 Direito de Amar (1987)

References

External links

1942 births
Living people
Brazilian film actresses
Actresses from Rio Grande do Sul